Axel Eriksson (14 April 1903 – 26 February 1960) was a Swedish long-distance runner. He competed in the men's 5000 metres at the 1924 Summer Olympics.

References

External links
 

1903 births
1960 deaths
Athletes (track and field) at the 1924 Summer Olympics
Swedish male long-distance runners
Olympic athletes of Sweden
Place of birth missing